The splendid skink (Brachyseps splendidus) is a species of skink endemic to Madagascar.

References

Reptiles of Madagascar
Reptiles described in 1872
Brachyseps
Taxa named by Alfred Grandidier